New Left 95 (abbreviated: NK95 ) is a group of Lithuanian intellectuals and activists who launched their activities on 1 May 2007 with the declaration ‘New Left 95 Manifesto’, which brought together individual arguments on sociopolitical and cultural issues from the newer leftist perspective into the joint political stance of NK95. The preparation of the manifesto was coordinated by Dr Andrius Bielskis, a political philosopher with a PhD from Warwick University, who had returned to Lithuania after a lengthy spell of study and academic work in the UK in the summer of 2006.

During his presentation at the annual conference organized by “Santara Šviesa,” a mainstream liberal organization set up originally in the US by Valdas Adamkus, a former President of Lithuania, Andrius Bielskis urged for debate and political action to undo unjust political and social practices in Lithuania. The audience was left generally perplexed, but some younger participants, graduates of the Institute of Political Science and International Relations (TSPMI) in Vilnius, were inspired.

Already by December 2005 a group of Lithuanian university students along with a few other activists involved in the protest against the encroachment of privatization in public spaces in Vilnius (e.g. the movie theatre “Lietuva”) gathered at TSPMI for a conference where the Vilnius Leftist Club Manifesto was signed. This action paved a way for the initial consolidation of leftist activists.

During the autumn and winter 2006/2007, people from the two groups, joined by activists from other left-leaning groups and NGOs, came together, forming the core of the present day NK95. The final consolidation of the group came in June 2007, when the first NK95 conference was organized and set the tone for the further development. During the period of formation a virtual, email list based, organizational form was adopted as the most suitable for the formed community of practice.

The group now lists around 35/40 activists who each extend the reach of NK95 to many other groups and formally established organizations in Vilnius and other cities, thus sustaining a nationwide network for New Left public actions that are
organized and coordinated by self-appointed and group-approved initiators of individual actions on an ad hoc basis which may involve also organizational gatherings, if required.

The main forms of action undertaken by NK95 activists are: formal statements (letters of opposition or support, declarations, signed public statements, group petitions or other group statements) and communications with a wider audience (press releases, posters, interviews, website, etc.).

The main objective of NK95, outside the most obvious, the popularization of the 45 theses of the NK95 manifesto, is to galvanize the political life in Lithuania by bringing to the fore of public debate leftist political values and ideas, with the hope that sooner or later the whole political mindset and with it political practice will shift leftwards, given the unforgiving social and political reality which demands a new left approach and ideas.

Thus, the group actively promotes the values of social justice, equality, individual and collective emancipation, as well as supporting a broader socially progressive agenda (e.g. gay rights). In order to achieve this aim two strategies are employed: 1) stirring up the debate by individual or group texts (mainly channeled through Internet news portals which allow more freedom of expression for non-staff writers as comparing to traditional media which are too corrupt), 2) organizing PR campaigns by indirect actions getting media and commentators involved in the cycle of self-denial, which helps to raise publicity for a particular issue. Another strategy for action which is being considered is organizing educational events, such as seminars, conferences or evening classes for the general public, where academic potential of NK is and can be tapped.

The first two pilot events organized under the banner of “New Left audience” featured Dr Kelvin Knight (London Metropolitan University, Britain) and Mr Svenn Arne Lie (Bergen University, Norway) as the main speakers, showing the potential of such form of public action because of the enormous interest received not only from the Lithuanian
leftist organizations but also from the general public. Being aware of the limitations that any voluntary social formation faces as well as being dependent solely on individual goodwill and contribution of its members, NK95 has taken a course towards establishing international contacts at the international scene in order to be able to sustain its activism on the basis of co-sharing of resources via contact network. For that reason the Manifesto has been translated into German, English and French and contacts have been established with intellectuals from the UK and
Norway as the first step towards the rebirth of the international New Left.

External links
Official website

2007 establishments in Lithuania
New Left
Political movements in Lithuania